John William Drane is a Christian theologian and author. He is probably best known for his two books on the Bible, Introducing the Old Testament and Introducing the New Testament.

Biography

Drane studied at the University of Aberdeen, where he was a student of I. Howard Marshall, and later obtained a PhD from the University of Manchester, where his mentor was F. F. Bruce. His doctoral research focused on Gnosticism in relation to early Christian thought and practice.

He began his academic career working at University of Stirling, Scotland. At the beginning of the 21st century he moved to the Divinity School at the University of Aberdeen. At the end of 2004 he resigned from that post to become a self-employed consultant, working with churches of different denominations.

For a period in the 1990s he was chairperson of the National Prayer Breakfast for Scotland. He has been co-chair of the Mission Theology Advisory Group (jointly sponsored by the Church of England and Churches Together in Britain and Ireland); and a member of the board of the Fresh Expressions initiative of the Church of England.

Drane is married to Olive Fleming Drane, who is also a theologian, and they have three children.

Selected bibliography
 "From one pioneer to another: insights from St Paul", in Dave Male (ed), Pioneers 4 Life: explorations in theology and wisdom for pioneering leaders (Oxford: BRF 2011), pp. 149–164.
 Introducing the Bible, 2nd edition (Minneapolis: Fortress Press 2011).  
 Introducing the Old Testament, 3rd edition (Oxford: Lion / Minneapolis: Fortress Press 2011).  
 ‘Resisting McDonaldization: will Fresh Expressions of church inevitably go stale?’, in Viggo Mortensen & Andreas Osterlund Nielsen (eds), Walk Humbly with the Lord: Church and Mission engaging Plurality (Grand Rapids: Eerdmans 2011), pp. 150–166.
 Introducing the New Testament, 3rd edition (Oxford: Lion / Minneapolis: Fortress Press 2010).    
 The World of the Bible, Oxford: Lion, 2009.    
 After McDonaldization: Mission, Ministry and Christian Discipleship in an Age of Uncertainty, London: Darton, Longman & Todd, 2008.   
 "What does maturity in the emerging church look like?", in Steven Croft (ed), Mission-shaped Questions: defining issues for today’s church (London: Church House Publishing 2008), pp. 90–101.
 co-authored with O M Fleming Drane, "Worship and Preaching", in Janet Wootton (ed), This is our Story: Free Church Women’s Ministry (Peterborough: Epworth Press 2007), pp. 50–67.
 "Alpha and Evangelism in Modern and Post-Modern Settings," in The Alpha Phenomenon, Andrew Brookes ed., London: CTBI, 2007, pp. 370–384. 
 Celebrity Culture, Edinburgh: Rutherford House, 2006. 
 "From Creeds to Burgers: religious control, spiritual search, and the future of the world", in James R Beckford & John Walliss, Theorising Religion (London: Ashgate 2006), pp. 120–131. Also in abbreviated form in George Ritzer, McDonaldization: the Reader 2nd edition (Thousand Oaks: Pine Forge Press, 2006), pp. 197–202.
 "Post-modernity, Truth, and the rise of the Documentary", in Theology Notes and News 52/2 (2005), pp. 16–21.
 Do Christians Know How to be Spiritual? The Rise of New Spirituality and the Mission of the Church, London: Darton, Longman & Todd, 2005. 
 Introducing the Bible: with CD-ROM, Minneapolis: Fortress Press, 2005. 
 co-authored with O M Fleming Drane, Family Fortunes: Faith-full Caring for Today’s Families (London: Darton Longman and Todd 2004).
 "Contemporary culture and the reinvention of sacramental spirituality", in Geoffrey Rowell & Christine Hall (eds), The Gestures of God: explorations in sacramentality (London: Continuum 2004), pp. 37–55.
 "Community, mystery, and the future of the church", in Simon Holt & Gordon Preece (eds), The Bible and the Business of Life: essays in honour of Robert J Banks’s 65th birthday (Adelaide: ATF Press 2004), pp. 87–100.
 co-authored with Ross Clifford & Philip S. Johnson, Beyond Prediction: The Tarot and Your Spirituality, Oxford: Lion Publishing, 2001. 
 Introducing the New Testament, rev. ed., Minneapolis: Fortress Press, 2001. 
 Introducing the Old Testament, rev. ed., Minneapolis: Fortress Press, 2001. 
 Cultural Change and Biblical Faith: The Future of the Church. Biblical and Missiological Essays for the New Century. Carlise: Paternoster Press, 2000. .
 The McDonaldization of the Church: Spirituality, Creativity, and the Future of the Church, London: Darton, Longman & Todd, 2000, 
 What is the New Age Still Saying to the Church?, London: HarperCollins, 1999, 
 The New Lion Encyclopedia of the Bible, Lion Books,

External links
 
Blog

Scottish Christian theologians
Living people
Scottish scholars and academics
British biblical scholars
Year of birth missing (living people)